First Gas Limited is a natural gas transmission and distribution company in New Zealand. First Gas's network has 2,204 km of high pressure pipelines and 4,800 km of gas distribution pipelines. Through Flex Gas, First Gas owns and operates the Ahuroa Gas Storage Facility.

History
The Natural Gas Corporation (NGC) was established by the New Zealand government to buy, process, and wholesale natural gas from the Kapuni gas field, which was discovered in 1959. NGC built the first high pressure gas transmission lines in the late 1960s, initially supplying Kapuni gas to Auckland, Hamilton, New Plymouth, Wanganui, Palmerston North, and Wellington. The network was expanded through the 1970s and 1980s, supporting the major expansion of the oil and gas industry at that time.

NGC was privatised in 1992. The Australian Gas Light (AGL) sold NGC to Vector Limited in 2004 and 2005. The company was again sold in 2016 to First State Funds, being renamed First Gas during the acquisition.

In 2016, First Gas purchased the Maui natural gas pipeline from Maui Development for $335 million. This is the main gas transmission pipeline in New Zealand. It is 307 km long, stretching from the Oaonui production station north of Ōpunake through to Huntly Power Station in Huntly, and carries 78% of New Zealand's onshore and offshore natural gas. At that time, ownership of Maui Development was between Shell (84%), OMV NZ (10%) and Todd Energy (6%).

In 2017, First Gas purchased the Ahuroa Gas Storage Facility from Contact Energy.

Statistics

Distribution

See also
Oil and gas industry in New Zealand

References

External links
 

Companies based in New Plymouth
Oil and gas companies of New Zealand
New Plymouth